Lovers Prayers is the seventh and most recent studio album by American indie rock band Ida, released in 2008 on Tiger Style Records. It has been reviewed by Allmusic, Pitchfork, Magnet Magazine, and PopMatters. Band members Mitchell and Littleton performed songs from the album on the NPR newsmagazine show The Bryant Park Project.

Track listing

Personnel
Musicians
 Jean Cook – violin
 Levon Helm – drums on "First Light"
 Michael Hurley – wurlitzer on "Worried Mind", viola on "Blue Clouds"
 Ruth Keating – drums, percussion, glockenspiel, melodica, shruti box
 Daniel Littleton – guitar, percussion, piano, harmonium, viola
 Elizabeth Mitchell – guitar, harmonium, wurlitzer
 Tara Jane ONeil – guitar, drums
 Jane Scarpantoni – cello
 Karla Schickele – bass, wurlitzer, tambourine, piano
 Matt Sutton – guitar, pedal steel guitar

Technical personnel
 Warren Defever – producer, engineer, mixing
 Justin Guip – engineer, mixing
 Sean Price – engineer
 Daniel Littleton – engineer
 Greg Calbi – mastering
 Tara Jane ONeil – art
 Silver Mountain Media – design

References 

2008 albums
Ida (band) albums